The Skoda 75 mm Model 1928 (75 mm M.28) was a mountain gun manufactured by Skoda Works and exported to Yugoslavia. It was a modernized version of the Skoda 75 mm Model 15. The gun typically had a 75 mm barrel; however, it could be fitted with a 90 mm barrel. The Wehrmacht redesignated these guns as 7.5 cm GebK 28 (in Einheitslafette mit 9 cm GebH) or 7.5 cm GebK 285(j). The gun crew was protected by an armoured shield.

References
 Chamberlain, Peter and Gander, Terry. Infantry, Mountain and Airborne Guns 
 Gander, Terry and Chamberlain, Peter. Weapons of the Third Reich: An Encyclopedic Survey of All Small Arms, Artillery and Special Weapons of the German Land Forces 1939-1945. New York: Doubleday, 1979 
http://worldwar2.ro/arme/?article=305

Mountain artillery
World War II field artillery
Artillery of Czechoslovakia
75 mm artillery
Military equipment introduced in the 1920s